Robert De Witt Fitch, known as Bob Fitch, (1939–2016) was an American photographer during the civil rights movement.

Early life and education 
Robert De Witt Fitch was born on July 20, 1939, in Los Angeles, California. His parents were Robert Fitch and Marion Weeks De Witt. His father was a minister with the United Church of Christ and professor of Christian ethics.

Fitch went to high school in Berkeley, California during the 1950s. In 1961, Fitch earned a B.A. in Psychology at Lewis & Clark College. Fitch later earned both a B.A. and a Master of Divinity at the Pacific School of Religion. His father was dean of the Pacific School of Religion. In 1965, Fitch was ordained by the United Church of Christ.

Early career 
Early in his career, Fitch served as an intern at Glide Memorial United Methodist Church in San Francisco. There he worked with groups including street gangs, the homeless, hippies and LGBT groups. Fitch was later a labor organizer and a draft resistance counselor. Fitch worked at the California Department of Housing and Community Development and at the Resource Center for Nonviolence, in Sacramento and Santa Cruz.

Photography career

Death and legacy 
Fitch died on April 29, 2016 in Watsonville, California. He was aged 76 and died from complications of Parkinson's disease.

An archive of Fitch's photos is held at Stanford University Libraries. The archive is described as containing "over 200,000 images, primarily black and white photographs and negatives, spanning the period from 1965 to the present."

Selected exhibitions

See also 
 List of photographers of the civil rights movement

References

External links 
 Bob Fitch Photo official website
 Bob Fitch photography archive at Stanford University Libraries
 Guide to the Bob Fitch Photography Archive at the Online Archive of California

1939 births
2016 deaths
American photographers